The Serbian Embassy in Paris is Serbia's diplomatic mission to France. It is located at Rue Leonard de Vinci 5, 75016,  in Paris, France. The current ambassador is Nataša Marić.

Consulates 
There is also a Consulate General in Strasbourg (Consul General Mladen Mijović). Serbia also maintains Permanent Mission to the Council of Europe in Strasbourg, Ambassador Slađana Prica-Tavčiovska, and Permanent Mission to the UNESCO in Paris, Ambassador Dragoljub Najman.

In Paris there is also a Cultural Centre of  Serbia at 123, Rue St Martin. The current director of Cultural Centre is Radoslav Pavlović.

See also
France–Serbia relations
List of Ambassadors from Serbia
Foreign relations of Serbia

References

External links 
 Serbian Embassy in Paris

Paris
Serbia
France–Serbia relations